Kam Peng Estate is a public housing estate in Peng Chau, New Territories, Hong Kong. It is the only public housing estate in Peng Chau, and has only one residential block built in 1996.

Peng Lai Court is the only Home Ownership Scheme court in Peng Chau near Kam Peng Estate. It has only one residential block built in 1996.

Houses

Kam Peng Estate

Peng Lai Court

Politics
Kam Peng Estate and Peng Lai Court are located in Peng Chau & Hei Ling Chau constituency of the Islands District Council. It is currently represented by Josephine Tsang Sau-ho, who was elected in the 2019 elections.

See also

Public housing estates on outlying islands of Hong Kong

References

Peng Chau
Public housing estates in Hong Kong
Housing estates with centralized LPG system in Hong Kong